The Iveagh Trust  is a provider of affordable housing in and around Dublin, Ireland. It was initially a component of the Guinness Trust, founded in 1890 by Edward Cecil Guinness, 1st Earl of Iveagh, great-grandson of the founder of the Guinness Brewery, to help homeless people in Dublin and London. It is not otherwise related to the brewery company.

Guinness Partnership
The Guinness Trust extended its objectives outside London in 1962 and today operates in all parts of England as a member of the Guinness Partnership, a group of housing associations. 
However, the Iveagh Trust became a separate organisation in 1903 with responsibility for activities in Ireland. It was given a statutory legal basis by the "Dublin Improvement (Bull Alley Area) Act" of 1903. Today it is run as a charity under Irish law and liaises with such bodies as Dublin City Council and the Homeless Agency.

Current
In today's central Dublin several original buildings in the area of St Patrick's Cathedral, Patrick Street and Christ Church Cathedral are still managed. Following a report by John Lumsden, they were built between 1896 and 1945 by the Iveagh Trust, including formerly the Iveagh Public Baths and the Iveagh Market building on Francis Street. Lord Iveagh also made donations to St Patrick's Cathedral and created the St Patrick's Park gardens in 1901 between the cathedral and the Iveagh Trust buildings. Today's buildings were therefore only a part of a larger urban renewal plan, at a time when Dublin was infamous for its poverty and its unsanitary tenements.    

In more recent times new properties have been acquired in Leopardstown, Cork Street Dublin 8, Swords and Clongriffin, and a home for the elderly at Mount Anthony in south Dublin. Unlike Dublin City Council's housing list based on need, the trust has aimed to create mixed communities with smaller numbers. Each estate has a resident caretaker and a formal system of elected tenants' councils to advise of complaints or problems. The CEO of The Iveagh Trust is Aidan Culhane.

The Trust also runs the Iveagh Hostel in central Dublin for homeless men, providing basic accommodation, meals and such facilities as a gym and an internet access room. The original 508 cubicles have been converted to 195 bedrooms. Former residents include Liam O'Flaherty after leaving the army in 1917, and Patrick Kavanagh.

A former trust building for children to play in, known as "The Bayno", was closed in 1975, and now houses the Liberties College.

Flat 3B on the Bull Alley Estate is the only flat in The Iveagh Trust stock which has remained largely unchanged since the first tenants took up occupancy in 1904.  Following the death of the last tenant, Nellie Molloy, in 2002, Trustees decided that the flat should remain a museum – a visual reminder of flat design and of how families lived in the early days of The Iveagh Trust. Miranda, Lady Iveagh, donated the funds to purchase the content of the flat from Nellie’s family to enable this to happen. The Museum Flat is available for viewing by appointment.

References

Further reading
http://www.theiveaghtrust.ie
 http://www.theiveaghhostel.ie
 F.H.A. Aalen, The Iveagh Trust: the first hundred years 1890-1990, Iveagh Trust, 1990. 
Joe Joyce, The Guinnesses, Poolbeg Press, Dublin 2009. 
Dublin Public Libraries video, 2011

Housing associations based in the Republic of Ireland
1890 establishments in Ireland
Housing organisations based in the Republic of Ireland
Charities based in the Republic of Ireland
Organizations established in 1890